The United States Air Force's 147th Combat Communications Squadron (147 CBCS) is an Air National Guard combat communications unit located at San Diego, California.

Mission 
To provide rapidly-deployable communications support for global combat operations and disaster response, utilizing highly skilled Airmen and leading-edge communications technology.

Federal Mission

State Mission

History
The 147th Combat Communications Squadron was constituted as the 147th Aircraft Control Squadron (147 ACS) on May 27, 1946. Prior to its constitution, the unit was allocated to the National Guard Bureau and was later assigned to the state of California on May 24, 1946. The 147 ACS was organized as a unit on June 20, 1948, at the Lockheed Air Terminal, in Burbank, California. The Secretary of the Army bestowed Federal recognition on the unit on July 18, 1948. The unit later moved to its new home in San Fernando Valley Airport, California on January 26, 1951.

Assignments

Major Command/Gaining Command
Air National Guard/Air Combat Command (1 June 1992 – present)
Air National Guard/Tactical Air Command (???- ???)
Air National Guard/Air Force Communications Command (???- ???)
Air National Guard/Air Defense Command (???- ???)

Wing/Group
195th Wing

Previous designations
 147th Combat Communications Squadron (1 October 1986 – present)
147th Combat Information Systems Squadron (July 1985-1 October 1986)
147th Combat Communications Squadron (1976–1985)
147th Mobile Communications Squadron (1968–1976)
147th Communications Squadron (Tributary Team) (1960–1968)
147th Aircraft Warning and Control Squadron (1946–1960)

Bases stationed
San Diego, California (1988 – present)
Van Nuys, California (1953–1988)
Duncanville, Texas (1 May 1951 – 1 February 1953)
San Fernando Valley Airport, California (26 January 1951 – 1 May 1951)
Burbank, California (20 June 1948 – 26 January 1951)

Commanders
Lt Col Tracy Lloyd (2020-Present)
Lt Col Todd A. Curtright (2015–2020)
Lt Col Jeremy J Peralta
Lt Col Whitman (???-???)
Lt Col Victor Adame (2013–???)
Lt Col Douglas Hire (2002–2013)
Lt Col Virgil Iler (1994–2002)
Lt Col George Bowen (1989–??)
Lt Col Vernon H. Parsons (1983–1989)

Decorations
Air Force Outstanding Unit Award

See also
162d Combat Communications Group

References

Combat Communications 0147
Combat Communications
Military units and formations in California